ABS-CBN Regional Channel was a Philippine pay television channel which aired programming from the regional television and radio stations owned by ABS-CBN. The channel was launched as a test broadcast on August 1, 2016, and was officially launched on March 20, 2017.

ARC was the network's second attempt to have a subscription-television channel solely dedicated to regional programming. In 1996, when the then-Sarimanok Channel 37 (now ABS-CBN News Channel) was launched, 80% of its programming were produced in the network's regional operations centers located in Baguio, Bacolod, Cagayán de Oro, Cebú, Davao, Naga, Zamboanga, among others. The programming consists of newscasts which is aired live via satellite, public affairs shows such as Banat Visayas, Sulong Mindanao, drama, comedy and musical programs.

On January 10, 2018, ABS-CBN Corporation and Creative Programs announced that the channel would closedown on January 14, 2018, alongside Tag. Meanwhile, ABS-CBN Regional Channel on Sky Direct was rebranded as Liga, a sports channel that complements the programming of S+A with international football and local sports events, which was silently launched earlier on January 1.

Though it ceased broadcasting locally, ABS-CBN Regional Channel continued its international broadcast via iWantTFC until January 1, 2021.

Final programming

Newscasts

TV Patrol Regional versions

Luzon
TV Patrol North Luzon (Baguio/Dagupan/Laoag/Isabela/Pampanga)
Delivered in Filipino - Anchored by Dhobie de Guzman, Cris Zuñiga, Grace Alba, Harris Julio and Gracie Rutao
TV Patrol Southern Tagalog (Batangas)
Delivered in Filipino - Anchored by Jonathan Magistrado.
TV Patrol Bicol (Naga)
Delivered in Bicolano - Anchored by Gerard Lorbes and Rizza Mostar.

Visayas
TV Patrol Central Visayas (Cebu)
Delivered in Cebuano - Anchored by Leo Lastimosa.

Mindanao
TV Patrol Southern Mindanao (Davao)
Delivered in Cebuano - Anchored by Paul Palacio and Melanie Severino.

Current affairs reruns
 Ano Ngani? (Tacloban)
Delivered in Waray - Hosted by Ranulfo Docdocan.
 Arangkada (Cagayan de Oro) 
Delivered in Cebuano - Hosted by PJ dela Peña.
 Bida Kapampangan (Pampanga) 
Delivered in Kapampangan - Hosted by Richie Bondoc.
 Salandigan (Bacolod) 
Delivered in Hiligaynon - Hosted by Ryan Gamboa

Magazine shows
Agri Tayo Dito (Available on Knowledge Channel)
Mag TV Na
Mag TV Na, Amiga! (Bacolod)
Mag TV Na, Atin 'To! (Baguio)
Mag TV Na, Oragon! (Naga)
Mag TV Na, Asenso Ta! (Cagayan de Oro)
Mag TV Na! (Cebu)
Mag TV Na! Southern Mindanao (Davao)
Mag TV Na, De Aton Este! (Zamboanga)

Variety
Kapamilya, Mas Winner Ka! (Cebu, Bacolod and Davao editions)
Kapamilya Fiesta World (Co-produced by The Filipino Channel)
Kapamilya Karavan
MOR Cebu's Tingog Bisaya

See also
ABS-CBN

References

ABS-CBN Corporation channels
ABS-CBN Regional
Television networks in the Philippines
Defunct television networks in the Philippines
Television channels and stations established in 2016
Television channels and stations disestablished in 2018
Assets owned by ABS-CBN Corporation